The 1951 Indiana Hoosiers football team represented the Indiana Hoosiers in the 1951 Big Ten Conference football season. They participated as members of the Big Ten Conference. The Hoosiers played their home games at Memorial Stadium in Bloomington, Indiana. The team was coached by Clyde B. Smith, in his fourth and final year as head coach of the Hoosiers. At the end of the season, Smith was fired and replaced by Bernie Crimmins.

Schedule

1952 NFL draftees

References

Indiana
Indiana Hoosiers football seasons
Indiana Hoosiers football